History is a music venue in Toronto, Ontario, Canada. It is located at 1663 Queen Street East. The venue hosts various events such as concerts, live entertainment, galas and community programs and events.

Background
The venue was announced in June 2021 when both American company Live Nation Entertainment and Canadian musician Drake collaborated to open the venue later in the year. It has a capacity of 2,500 people and is expected to play up to 200 events per year, featuring general admission and seating options.

The venue was set to open in October 2021, but was postponed to November 7, 2021, when the venue officially opened to the public. The inaugural concert on its opening day was performed by Bleachers.

References

External links
 History Toronto

2021 establishments in Ontario
Music venues in Toronto
Theatres in Toronto